Saint Luke Institute (SLI) is an international, U.S.-based private, licensed mental health education and treatment facility that is based in Silver Spring, Maryland. SLI primarily serves Roman Catholic priests, permanent deacons, and consecrated men and women religious with depression, addictions, anxiety, trauma and stress-related disorders, personality disorders, interpersonal and boundary issues, and other mental health issues that may require clinical attention.

SLI provides psychological evaluations, intensive outpatient therapy, continuing care, consultation with religious leaders, and outpatient therapy. Education is offered online and in-person through SLIconnect.org. Saint Luke Center in Louisville, Kentucky, offers education, candidate assessments, and individual and group therapy.

History 
SLI was founded in 1981 by Father Michael Peterson, a priest with training as a psychiatrist from the University of California, San Francisco . SLI originally focused on treating priests with drug or alcohol addiction.  However, in 1983, it began focusing on priests who abused children, following the emergence of the case of Gilbert Gauthe, a Louisiana priest convicted of child sexual abuse.

From 1987 to 1992, SLI was led by Robert E. Bacher, who had served as Executive Secretary of United States Conference of Catholic Bishops’ Committee on Priestly Formation.

In 1992, Father Canice Connors was appointed as the third president of SLI.  A psychologist, Connors was the former president of Southdown, a Catholic psychiatric hospital near Toronto.  Connors described himself as a victim of child abuse by an older man.  Connors’ tenure in the early 1990s coincided with the rise of the child sexual abuse scandal in the United States. 

In the early 1990s, the treatment program at SLI included in-patient treatment of up to 32 inpatients and about 12 patients residing at neighborhood houses owned by SLI. Treatments included injections of Depro-Provera and individual and group therapy aimed at helping priests regain their celibacy; the latter differed from secular treatment, in which the effort was to get the men to transfer their sexual attraction to adults.  SLI also advised bishops across the country about whether priests could be returned to ministry (albeit forbidden from working with children); as of 1994 SLI had treated 137 priests, of which 60 had returned to ministry and 77 became inactive.  Of the inactive priests, 20 were convicted of crimes and sent to prison and others laicized.

From 1996 to 2009 (and again from 2013 to 2014), Stephen J. Rossetti served as SLI president. Rossetti first began working at  SLI in 1993. He soon was appointed executive vice president and chief operating officer.  In 2008, SLI set up the Saint Luke Institute Foundation, Inc. and transferred about $3.5 million into it; the purpose of the foundation was to provide financial support to SLI.

Rossetti stepped down as SLI's president in October 2009 to join the faculty of the Catholic University of America. He was  succeeded by Monsignor Edward J. Arsenault, a priest and administrator of the Diocese of Manchester in New Hampshire.  He had served as the public face of the Catholic hierarchy during Catholic sexual abuse scandal.  In 2013, Arsenault was accused of stealing money from the Diocese of Manchester and the estate of a deceased priest.  He was also accused of billing a hospital for consulting work he never performed, using the funds for gifts for himself and a male partner.  Arsenault pled guilty to felony theft and in 2014; he was sentenced to four years in prison and ordered to pay nearly $300,000 in restitution.

In the wake of Arsenault's resignation from SLI, Rossetti was asked to return as president of SLI. Sheila Harron was CEO. Rev. David Songy., a psychologist from Denver, became president on January 1, 2015.In June 2013, SLI purchased the St. Louis Consultation Center, which provides outpatient psychological and spiritual treatment, education and candidate assessments. Its name is now St. Luke Consultation Center.

Today 
Today, Saint Luke Institute is accredited by The Joint Commission and is licensed by the State of Maryland Department of Health.

See also
Roman Catholic Archdiocese of Washington
List of hospitals in Maryland

References

External links
Saint Luke Institute official site

Buildings and structures in Silver Spring, Maryland
Hospitals established in 1981
Non-profit organizations based in Maryland
Organizations based in the Baltimore–Washington metropolitan area
Psychiatric hospitals in Maryland
Silver Spring, Maryland (CDP)